The badminton mixed team tournament, for the 2013 Bolivarian Games started from 17 November to 18 November 2013.

Results

Group stage

Group A

Group B

Final stage

References

Events at the 2013 Bolivarian Games
Bolivarian Games
Badminton tournaments in Peru
2013 Mixed team